Korean International School of Bangkok is a Korean international school in Nongchok, Bangkok, Thailand.

The school serves up to the senior high school level.

It was established in 2001.

See also
 Koreans in Thailand

References

External links
 Korean International School of Bangkok 

Korean international schools in Asia
International schools in Bangkok
2001 establishments in Thailand
Educational institutions established in 2001
South Korea–Thailand relations